In astronomy, a discovery image is typically a drawing, film base photograph, photographic plate, or digital image in which a celestial object or phenomenon was first found. This can include planets, dwarf planets, small solar system bodies (asteroids, comets, etc.) or features found on or near those objects such as ring systems or large craters.

For example, a moon of Saturn, Phoebe, was the first satellite to be discovered photographically by William Henry Pickering on March 17, 1899 from photographic plates that had been taken starting on August 16, 1898 at Arequipa, Peru by DeLisle Stewart.

Examples

See also
Precovery

References

Further reading
Google Book Search : "discovery image" astronomy

Astronomical imaging
Astronomy image articles